Maytree (메이트리) is a South Korean five-member a cappella group.

History

Formation of the group (2000-2006)
The group was started in 2000 by the members of the university accapella club called "Gigahitz" where they created a 6 member group called "Mi wansung (美완성, a pun on the korean word that means incomplete and describes that they are beautifully complete.)." Three members of this original lineup left the group for personal reasons, and three new members Kim Jung-hoon (then baritone) Park Ji-eun (then soprano) and Choi Kyung-young (then tenor) joined the group to form their first lineup as 6-member group Maytree led by Jang Sang-in and Choi Hong-seok and released their first album "Maybe" in 2005. Even during these early days they appeared in commercials in South Korea.

Frequent member changes (2006-2017)
At some point, soprano  Park Ji-eun left the group and was replaced with Han Yeon-joo, earliest attestations from  2007 through their ad finding a new high tenor to replace former member Kim Jung-hoon (the lineup originally had a high tenor and second tenor) and Kang Su-kyong seems to have been alto.New member Choi Soo-bin replaced Han Yeon-joo and Chon Song-hyun replaced Choi Kyung-young in 2008. Jung Da-young and Kim Won-jong replaced two members Choi Hong-seok and Choi Soo-bin some time around 2014 to 2015. Lim Soo-yeon became a member some time around 2016. Kwon Young-hoon replaced Chon Song-hyun in 2017.

Members
The current members of the group are:
 Jang Sang-in, vocal percussion
 Kang Soo-kyung, alto
 Kwon Young-hoon, tenor
 Kim Won-jong, bass
 Lim Soo-yeon, soprano, tablet holder

Discography

Studio albums
 2006: Maytree
 2015: MayTree in Love (메이트리 인 러브)
 2020: Back to me (그대 내게 다시)

EPs
 2011: The MayTree
 2013: 5028

Singles
 2021: When Snowflakes Fell on Your Head (임수연)
 2021: What If (Andrea Figallo, Eddi Hüneke, Junko Kamei)

Sound effects and other covers
Beginning in 2021, the group began releasing a series of YouTube videos in which it covers sound effects used in computer and mobile phone systems.  The first video, released in January 2021, covered Windows sound effects. Others followed, including sound effects for iPhones and Samsung Galaxy phones, as well as the Angry Birds and other video games. The group then released covers of the introductory music for various major film distributors as well as others such as the music for the UEFA Champions League.  These covers have generated a significant amount of attention for MayTree.  For example, the iPhone covers, released on February 5, 2021, have generated (as of December 23, 2022) nearly 80 million views on YouTube. On October 1, 2021 at the height of the explosion of popularity of the South Korean show, Squid Game, which became Netflix's most popular ever series, Maytree released covers of some of the main themes from the show.  As of December 23, 2022, the video has amassed over 260 million views on YouTube.
 Windows sound effect 
 iPhone sound effect 
 Samsung Galaxy sound effect 
 Squid Game themes

Awards and nominations
 2009 3rd prize at the International A Cappella Competition
 2010 2nd prize at the International A Cappella Competition
 2011 Busan Choral International Competition - 1st prize of Popular Music category
 2011 Vokal Total International Competition (Graz), Gold Diploma
 2013 Yeosu Choral International Competition - 1st prize of Pop & Jazz category
 2014 World Choir Games - 2 Gold Medals of Jazz category and Pop choral category
 2018 Moscow A Capella Festival - 2nd place

References

Notes

External links
Official YouTube

South Korean musical groups
Professional a cappella groups
Musical groups established in 2000